The following is a list of people from Reno, Nevada:

 Mädchen Amick, actress, Twin Peaks, Sleepwalkers, Dream Lover
 Chris Ault, Hall of Fame NCAA football coach, retired head coach of University of Nevada, Reno Wolf Pack
 Luke Babbitt, basketball player for Miami Heat, previously Portland Trail Blazers 2010–2013
 Ryan Bader, professional MMA artist and heavyweight champion of Bellator MMA
 Shannon Bahrke, skier, silver medalist 2002 Winter Olympics, bronze medalist 2010 Winter Olympics, and 2003 World Cup champion
 Brent Boyd, pro football player of Minnesota Vikings
 T. Brian Callister, physician and health care quality expert
 Chris Carr, pro football player
 Bob Cashell, former Mayor of Reno and Lieutenant Governor
 Walter Van Tilburg Clark, author of The Ox-Bow Incident
 Doug Clifford, Creedence Clearwater Revival drummer
 Kimberley Conrad, Playboy Playmate of the Year (1989), Hugh Hefner's second ex-wife
 Heidi Cortez, Sunset Tan, The Howard Stern Show
 David Coverdale, singer-songwriter, former frontsinger of Deep Purple and Whitesnake
 Joe Flanigan, actor
 Rudy Galindo, figure skater
 Matt Gallagher, author and Iraq War veteran
 Bud Gaugh, drummer of the band Sublime
 Jim Gibbons, former Governor and U.S. Representative
 Mark Gilmartin, golfer, entrepreneur
 Curtis Hanson, producer-director of films 8 Mile, L.A. Confidential, The Hand That Rocks the Cradle, more
 Sean Hamilton (Hollywood Hamilton), nationally syndicated radio personality
 Jennifer Harman, professional poker player
 Wilder W. Hartley (1901–1970), Los Angeles City Council member, 1939–1941, born in Reno
 Martin Heinrich, U.S. Senator from New Mexico since 2013; was considered for nominee Hillary Clinton's Vice President for the 2016 election
 Procter Ralph Hug, Jr., federal judge
 Terri Ivens, actress on All My Children
 Kevin Jepsen, professional baseball player, attended Bishop Manogue High School
 Colin Kaepernick, football quarterback, University of Nevada, Reno and San Francisco 49ers
 Mike Krukow, MLB pitcher and broadcaster, Reno resident
 Mills Lane, boxing referee, district judge, television personality on Judge Mills Lane
 Adam Laxalt, former Nevada Attorney General
 Paul Laxalt, former Governor and U.S. Senator from Nevada
 Greg Lemond, former professional road racing cyclist, three-time winner of the Tour de France
 Greg London, entertainer
 Jennifer Mabus, YouTuber, hiker, and Navy spouse
 Julia Mancuso, skier, Olympic gold medalist 2006
 Rich Marotta, boxing commentator, Los Angeles radio personality
 Anne Henrietta Martin, first woman to run for U.S. Senate
 Pat McCarran, U.S. Senator, namesake of McCarran International Airport
 April Meservy, singer-songwriter
 Tom Mylan, butcher, author
 Jessica Nigri, cosplay celebrity, promotional model, YouTuber, voice actress and fan convention interview correspondent
 Frank Herbert Norcross, judge
 Roger Norman, off-road racer and owner of Norman Motorsports
 Ivan Passer, director
 Carl Ravazza, bandleader and talent agent
 Chuck Ruff, drummer, Edgar Winter Group
 Brian Sandoval, former Governor
 Gene Savoy, Peru explorer, discoverer of Vilcabamba, Gran Pajaten, Gran Vilaya, Gran Saposoa
 Nate Schierholtz, professional baseball player, born in Reno
 Hillary Schieve, Mayor of Reno
 Will Schusterick, professional disc golfer and three-time winner of the United States Disc Golf Championship
 Jason-Shane Scott, soap opera actor
 Ken Shamrock, mixed martial artist, UFC Hall of Famer, professional wrestler
 Simons & Cameron (Gordon Simons and Lane Cameron), singers and songwriters
 Shannyn Sossamon, actress of A Knight's Tale, 40 Days and 40 Nights and The Rules of Attraction
 Kevin Stadler, pro golfer, born in Reno
 Inga Thompson, professional cyclist
 Kyle Van Noy, professional football player, born in Reno
 Gabriel Damon, actor 
 Willy Vlautin, novelist, lead vocalist and songwriter for Alt-Country band Richmond Fontaine
 J. Buzz Von Ornsteiner, forensic psychologist, television personality
 Michael Weiss, competitive swimmer 
 Dawn Wells, Miss Nevada 1959, actress on TV series Gilligan's Island
 Joe Wieland, professional baseball player
 Taylor Wilson, nuclear scientist; previously held record for being youngest person to achieve nuclear fusion
 David Wise, five-time World Cup medalist and Olympic gold medalist in half pipe skiing
 Dolora Zajick, dramatic mezzo-soprano
 Garrett Hampson, professional baseball player

See also 
 List of University of Nevada, Reno people

References 

Reno, Nevada